Ratna RajyaLaxmi Campus, commonly known as RR Campus, is a constituent college of Tribhuvan University (TU). It is also the largest college for the Humanities and Social sciences studies. It provides under-graduate and master's degree level programs. The college was named after Queen Ratna Rajya Lakshmi Devi Shah, second wife of the then King Mahendra Bir Bikram Shah Dev.

Location 
Ratna Rajya Laxmi Campus is located in Pradarsani Marga, Kathmandu, Nepal. It occupies 8 ropanis of land.

History 

Historically, Ratna Rajya Laxmi Campus was established on Bhadra 4, 2018 BS with 3 girl students in the building of Guthi Sansthan at Putali Sadak. Initially, this campus was named as Ratna Rajya Laxmi Girls' College. Ratna Rajya Laxmi Campus is situated in the prime location of the Kathmandu Metropolitan city, Pradarshani Marg, the heart of this nation. It occupies about 8 ropanis of land, the Exhibition Road to the East, Adwait marga to West, and Kathmandu Model Hospital to North and Law Campus to the south.

Those days, classes were conducted in the morning shift only. It offered Intermediate of Arts Courses with various majors of Humanities and Social Sciences. The higher caste families’ girls of Kathmandu valley received education. During the time of Girls' College, it upgraded to BA level in 2021 BS. The location of the college was shifted from Putali Sadak to Pradarsani Marga in 2024 BS, where it permanently stands proudly up to this date catering invaluable knowledge on various fields of Humanities and Social Sciences. Since 2024 B.S., Ratna Rajya Laxmi Girls' College was affiliated in Tribhuvan University. In 2025, it became a multiple college as it added up management program in it along with humanities courses. It ran Management program up to 2030 BS.

The college became co-ed and was made open for all Nepalese families by changing it from Ratna Rajya Laxmi Girls' College to Ratna Rajya Laxmi Campus in 2031 BS. It later got popularized as RR Campus. Since 2031, Ratna Rajya Laxmi Campus became well known as the center of Humanities and Social Sciences, a renowned constituent campus of Tribhuvan University till date. The number of students so grew that Ratna Rajya Laxmi Campus ran IA classes in three shifts with varieties of majors to address the student pressure since 2037 B.S. Humanities and social sciences courses thrived with the scintillating image of Ratna Rajya Laxmi Campus in the three different shifts. The campus offered BA level programs of all subjects that it offered in IA since 2038 BS only in the morning shift in the beginning. Similarly, RR Campus provided BA level courses in all three shifts up to 2072 BS academic session. It has slashed its evening shift BA program since 2073. Now, it is running BA programs only in two shifts, i.e. in the morning and day shifts.

Courses 
RR Campus has been continuously running 15 different departments of Humanities and Social Sciences for the last six decades. RR Campus has been continuously offering majors in Nepali, English, Economics, Political Science, History, Geography, Home Science, Mathematics, Music, Psychology, Population Studies, Sociology and Anthropology, Journalism and Mass Communication, and Rural Development etc.

Ratna Rajya Laxmi Campus offers different types of undergraduate and graduate level courses with recognition from Tribhuvan University:

Undergraduate degree courses 
Bachelor of Arts (B.A.)
Bachelor in Computer Application (BCA)

Graduate degree courses 
 Master of Arts (M.A) in English
 Master of Arts (M.A) in Nepali
 Master of Arts (M.A) in Population Studies
 Master of Arts (M.A) in Journalism and Mass Communication
 Master of Arts (M.A) in Sociology
 Master of Arts (MA) in Economics

Notable people
 Aaryan Sigdel, popular actor
Astalaxmi Shakya, Nepali politician
Bipin Karki, Nepalese actor
Bhuwan Dhungana, Nepali poet and writer
Buddhisagar, Nepali writer and poet
Neeta Dhungana, Nepali actress
Mala Rajya Laxmi Shah, Indian politician
Sindhu Malla, popular singer
Sulochana Manandhar, Nepali poet, writer
Swapnil Smriti, Nepali writer
Udit Narayan, popular singer

Gallery

See also 
 Pulchowk Campus
 Tribhuvan University
 Nepal Law Campus
 Shanker Dev Campus
 Institute of Medicine, Nepal
Padma Kanya Multiple Campus
Amrit Campus
Ayurveda Campus, Kirtipur

References 

1961 establishments in Nepal
Tribhuvan University